Chionodes metoecus is a moth in the family Gelechiidae. It is found in North America, where it has been recorded from southern British Columbia, Montana, Oregon, Colorado, Utah, Arizona, New Mexico, Nevada and California.

The larvae are leaf-tiers on Acer glabrum.

References

Chionodes
Moths described in 1999
Moths of North America